Gilla Mochua Ó Caiside, Irish poet, fl. 12th century.

Ó Caiside was a member of a family situated in what is now County Fermanagh. The Ó Caisides were originally a medical family, who were hereditary physicians to the Maguires. A group of poems attributed to him survive; they were printed by C. Plummer in 1922.

References

 Bethada Náem nÉrenn:Lives of Irish Saints, vol. i, pp. 287–88, vol. ii, pp. 278–80, ed. and trans. C. Plummer, Oxford, 1922.

Medieval Irish poets
People from County Fermanagh
12th-century Irish writers
12th-century Irish poets
Irish male poets
Irish-language writers